Shurja (also Romanized as Shūrjā; also known as Sarjāh, Shoorcheh, and Shūrjeh) is a village in Shivanat Rural District, Afshar District, Khodabandeh County, Zanjan Province, Iran. At the 2006 census, its population was 241, in 45 families.

References 

Populated places in Khodabandeh County